This is a list of the Swiss Hitparade number-one hits of 2021.

Swiss charts

References
 Swiss No.1 Singles and Albums 2021

Number-one hits
Switzerland
2021